Rainer Tudyka is a German ice hockey player, who competed for SG Dynamo Weißwasser. He won the bronze medal with the East Germany national ice hockey team at the 1966 European Championships.

Tudyka played a total of 27 games for East Germany at the World Championships between 1963 and 1967, recording no points.

References 

Living people
Year of birth missing (living people)
German ice hockey players